The Rocky Horror Show is a video game, based on the musical of the same name, it was developed and published by CRL Group.  It was released for Apple II, Commodore 64, Commodore 128, ZX Spectrum, and Amstrad CPC created by the CRL Group PLC.

The game received generally positive reviews from video game critics.

Gameplay
Based on the musical of the same name, The Rocky Horror Show has the player control either Brad or Janet collecting the pieces of the Medusa machine from around the castle in order to de-Medusa the player's partner. The other characters attempt to slow down Brad and Janet, with Riff Raff and Eddie having the ability to kill the player.

Development
The Rocky Horror Show was published and developed by CRL Group, having made previously licensed games such as The War of the Worlds. In 1984, negotiations by CRL were made to obtain the rights to make a computer game on the property. CRL's CEO Clem Chambers claimed in an interview with GamesTM that the rights holder for the property approached the company after being impressed by their work with The War of the Worlds. Chambers stated he wanted to base the game on the environments of the stage show instead of "the elements of dubious taste in the show itself".

Rocky Horrors creator Richard O'Brien did not have much involvement with making the game, due to being "terrified of technology". Ian Ellery, a fan of Rocky Horror, was the game's programmer.

There were separate versions of the game released for C64 and C128. The former was a straight ZX Spectrum port while the latter featured completely reworked graphics with more detailed characters and more colourful backgrounds. In the game itself there were a few new locations to be found.

Reception

The Rocky Horror Show received generally positive reviews.

Roy Wagner reviewed the game for Computer Gaming World, and stated that "The game is a challenge, but is it worth it? I think not."

Zzap!64 thought the Commodore 64 version was inferior to the Spectrum version and did not have much lasting appeal. They rated it 43% overall.

Retrospectives of the game have also been positive. Retro Gamer considered the game to be decent and worth playing. Sam Derboo from Hardcore Gaming 101 criticized the Commodore 64 version for running slow compared to the Spectrum and Amstrad versions.

References

External links
 
 
 

1985 video games
Adventure games
Amstrad CPC games
Commodore 64 games
Single-player video games
Rocky Horror
Video games developed in the United Kingdom
ZX Spectrum games
CRL Group games